De Nios lyrikpris (English: De Nio Lyrical Prize) is a Swedish literature prize given by Samfundet De Nio since 2008. The prize has however been given only one time. The prize money is 125 000 Swedish kronor two times.

Prizewinner
 2008 – Marie Lundquist and Eva Runefelt

External links 
 Samfundet De Nio homepage

Awards established in 1970
Swedish literary awards